Čáry is a village in Senica District in the Trnava Region of western Slovakia.

History
In historical records the village was first mentioned in 1392.

Geography
The municipality lies at an altitude of 170 metres, covers an area of 14.940 km2, and has a population of about 1,251 people.

Genealogical resources

The records for genealogical research are available at the state archive "Statny Archiv in Bratislava, Slovakia"

 Roman Catholic church records (births/marriages/deaths): 1783-1896 (parish A)
 Lutheran church records (births/marriages/deaths): 1786-1895 (parish B)

See also
 List of municipalities and towns in Slovakia

References

External links

http://www.cary.sk
Surnames of living people in Cary

Villages and municipalities in Senica District